Michael Anthony Richardt (born May 24, 1958, at North Hollywood, California) is an American former Major League Baseball second baseman. He also played in 16 games for the Houston Astros at the end of the 1984 season.

After a brief trial in 1980, Richardt spent the entire  season in the minor leagues with the Wichita Aeros. There, he led the American Association in batting average at .354. After a return trip to the minor leagues in May, he returned to the majors and spent the last four months of the season as the Rangers' regular second baseman. That year, he batted .241 in 119 games, hitting 3 of his 4 career home runs while driving in 43 runs. He also stole 9 bases in 10 attempts.

Richardt started the  season in the same position, but had some problems that season. He got into a fistfight with teammate Mickey Rivers on a plane trip home and by the end of April he was batting just .194. Eventually, he was replaced in the lineup by Wayne Tolleson. Richardt returned to the minor leagues, and received only a few more brief trials over the remainder of the season and in 1984. In May 1984, he was traded to the Astros for Alan Bannister.

Starting  in the minors, Richardt played just 13 games that season, and then was out of organized baseball for two full years. After playing 28 games for the Tulsa Drillers, however, he was out of baseball for good.

References

Sources

Major League Baseball second basemen
Texas Rangers players
Houston Astros players
Gulf Coast Rangers players
Asheville Tourists players
Tulsa Drillers players
Charleston Charlies players
Wichita Aeros players
Oklahoma City 89ers players
Tucson Toros players
Fresno Suns players
Fresno City Rams baseball players
Baseball players from Los Angeles
1958 births
Living people